Lieutenant-Colonel Thomas Melville Dill OBE (23 December 1876 – 7 March 1945) was a prominent Bermudian lawyer, politician, and soldier.

Early life
Dill was born in Devonshire Parish, in the British Imperial fortress colony of Bermuda, the son of Mary Lea (née Smith) and Thomas Newbold Dill. The Dill family had been established in Bermuda in the 1630s. 

Thomas Newbold Dill (1837–1910) was a merchant, a Member of the Colonial Parliament (MCP) for Devonshire Parish from 1868 to 1888, a Member of the Legislative Council and an Assistant Justice from 1888, Mayor of the City of Hamilton from 1891 to 1897, served on numerous committees and boards, and was a member of the Devonshire Church (Church of England) and Devonshire Parish vestries (the latter is now termed a Parish Council). 

Thomas Melville Dill was named for his seafaring paternal grandfather, who had lost his master's certificate after the wreck of the Bermudian-built Cedrine on the Isle of Wight, which had been returning the last convict labourers from the Royal Naval Dockyard in Bermuda to Britain in 1863.

Military career

Thomas Dill entered the fledgeling Bermuda Volunteer Rifle Corps in 1895 as a rifleman, before transferring to the Bermuda Militia Artillery, a reserve of the Royal Regiment of Artillery, as a lieutenant. The British Army maintained a large Bermuda Garrison of regular and part-time artillery and infantry units to guard the Royal Naval Dockyard, Bermuda, and other strategic assets. 

By 1914, then-Captain Dill was the Commandant, but he handed that position to a subordinate to lead the unit's First Contingent to the Western Front, receiving a temporary regular commission as a Major. 

Serving as part of the larger Royal Garrison Artillery draft to the front, the Bermudian contingent was strongly praised by Field Marshal Douglas Haig. 

After the war, Major Dill returned to Bermuda, resuming his command of the BMA.<ref>[https://www.thegazette.co.uk/London/issue/32445/supplement/7034 BERMUDA MILITIA ARTILLERY. Maj. T. M. Dill to be Comdt. 12th Nov. 1919. The London Gazette. Publication date: 2 September 1921. Supplement: 32445. Page: 703.]</ref> His substantive rank was still Captain 'til he was promoted to substantive Major in 1921, though dated 12 November 1919. He retired on 21 April 1928 with the honorary-rank of lieutenant-colonel (substantive rank of major).The London Gazette (15 June 1928). Issue: 33394. Page: 4109 (erroneously named as D. M. Dill; corrected in issue of 17 July 1928).

Legal and political careers
In addition to his role as a military officer, Dill pursued a legal career, becoming Bermuda's Attorney General. 

He entered politics, and served as a Member of the Colonial Parliament (MCP) for Devonshire parish from 1904 until 1938. He was also appointed to the Executive Council. He was an avid historian, whose articles were published in the Bermuda Historical Quarterly.

Personal life
Dill married Ruth Rapalje Neilson (1880–1973) on 15 October 1900, and they had several children, some of whom followed him to positions of prominence in Bermuda or abroad. Their children were Ruth Rapalje Dill (1901–1986), Thomas Newbold Dill (1903–1970), Sir Nicholas Bayard Dill (known as Bayard Dill) (1905–1993), Laurence Dill (1907–1984), Helen Dill (1912–2004), Frances Rapalje Dill (1915–2009) and Diana Dill (1923–2015). 

Bayard Dill was an officer in the Bermuda Volunteer Engineers, a founding member of the Conyers, Dill & Pearman'' law firm (that played an important role in Bermuda's development as an offshore business centre), and a prominent politician who was knighted in 1951. He also played a key role in negotiating the agreement with the USA for its military and naval bases in Bermuda during the Second World War. 

Ruth Dill was married to John Seward Johnson I, heir to the Johnson & Johnson fortune. Their children included Mary Lea Johnson Richards, John Seward Johnson II, and Diana Firestone. Diana Dill moved to the US, becoming an actress. She was married to actor Kirk Douglas, with whom she had two sons, actor and producer Michael Douglas, and producer Joel Douglas. His grandson, the Right Reverend Nicholas Dill (of the Anglican Church of Bermuda), was installed as Bishop of Bermuda on 29 May 2013.

Death
Dill died of a heart attack on 7 March 1945, following injuries sustained during a fall in February. He was eulogised on the front page of The Royal Gazette.

References

External links
 Roots Web: Portrait T.M. Dill
 Review of Diana Dill's autobiography, "In The Wings"
 Barnes & Noble Excerpt from Diana Dill's autobiography, "In The Wings"
 POTSI (archived): BMA History by Jennifer Hind
 POTSI (archived): BMA Images
 Essay on Bermuda Militia Artillery, by Jennifer Hind, which makes frequent mention of TM Dill

1876 births
1945 deaths
Bermudian politicians
Bermudian soldiers
British colonial army officers
British Army personnel of World War I
Military of Bermuda
Royal Artillery officers
Officers of the Order of the British Empire
People from Devonshire Parish
Bermudian people of World War II
Dill family
British Militia officers